is a Japanese football player for Oita Trinita.

Career
While attending Ryutsu Keizai University, Albirex Niigata watched Watanabe and even signed him as a special designated player in the 2017 season. In January 2018, Watanabe joined Albirex's top team and scored in four consecutive games during the 2018 season.

Club statistics
Updated to end of 2018 season.

References

External links

Profile at J. League
Profile at Albirex Niigata

1995 births
Living people
Association football people from Niigata Prefecture
Japanese footballers
J1 League players
J2 League players
Albirex Niigata players
Oita Trinita players
Association football forwards